Gminatus australis is a species of true bug in the family Reduviidae.

Description
Body red and orange, legs and head black. Mouthparts short, thick and curved.

Range
South-western and eastern mainland Australia and Tasmania.

References

Taxa named by Wilhelm Ferdinand Erichson
Insects described in 1842
Insects of Australia
Reduviidae